Joniškėlis Manor is a former residential manor in Joniškėlis. It is one of the biggest buildings and parks ensemble in Zemgale. Manor territory is currently used by Lithuanian Institute of Agriculture.

Gallery

References

External links 
  
 

Manor houses in Lithuania
Classicism architecture in Lithuania